The Ring and the Rajah is a 1914 British silent drama film directed by Harold M. Shaw and starring Edna Flugrath, Arthur Holmes-Gore and Vincent Clive.

It was written by Anne Merwin.

Cast
 Edna Flugrath as Edith Blayne 
 Arthur Holmes-Gore as The Rajah 
 Vincent Clive as Captain Blayne 
 Edward O'Neill as Ferak

References

Bibliography
 Geoffrey Nowell-Smith. The Oxford History of World Cinema. Oxford University Press, 1996.

External links
 

1914 films
1914 drama films
British silent feature films
British drama films
Films directed by Harold M. Shaw
British black-and-white films
1910s English-language films
1910s British films
Silent drama films